The Lord of the Manor is a comic opera by the British soldier and playwright John Burgoyne. It was first staged at the Drury Lane Theatre in December 1780. It was written by Burgoyne for his lover, the actress Susan Caulfield.

References

Bibliography
 Nicoll, Allardyce. A History of English Drama 1660-1900. Volume III: Late Eighteenth Century Drama. Cambridge University Press, 1952.
 Thomson, Peter. The Cambridge Introduction to English Theatre, 1660-1900. Cambridge University Press, 2006.

Plays by John Burgoyne
1780 plays